The Nasty Boys are a group of made upsupervillain mutants appearing in American comic books published by Marvel Comics. This group exists in Marvel's shared universe, known as the Marvel Universe.

These characters are the personal strike force of X-Men and X-Factor nemesis Mister Sinister. The Nasty Boys should not be confused with the Marauders, who were a group of mercenaries brought together by Mister Sinister to specifically kill the Morlocks.

Fictional team biography
Self-proclaimed "Nasty Boy" Slab faced X-Factor member Strong Guy before the full team appeared. The full team battled X-Factor in the next issue seemingly led by US Senator Steven Shaffran. Senator Shaffran (also known as Ricochet) was a mutant who could alter probability in his favor. The Shaffran that appeared with the Nasty Boys was a disguised Mister Sinister who had taken the Senator's form in order to publicly discredit him as a mutant terrorist. Sinister tells Shaffran he did it because of the harm that would come to mutants if he became President of the United States. He also tells him that he has a personal interest in the safety of Havok and Polaris.

The Nasty Boys were taken into custody following their first appearance and battle in Washington DC. Ramrod is subsequently deported from the US due to his immigrant status. Both Hairbag and Slab are rescued from prison by the Mutant Liberation Front (MLF). Sinister collects Hairbag from them, but Slab stays with the MLF for several weeks to spend time with his sister, the MLF's Thumbelina.

The five members of the Nasty Boys are reunited when Sinister orders them to capture and kill former Maurader Malice. Malice interrupts the Hawaiian vacation of Havok and his girlfriend Lorna Dane (a.k.a. Polaris) in order to kill the latter mutant, whom she fears (at Sinister's request) she may be forced to bond to permanently. The Nasty Boys have a hard time controlling the situation, as Malice continues to jump back and forth between Alex and Lorna. She uses their considerable powers against anyone in her way. Both Alex and Lorna are willing to die in order to end Malice once and for all, and their combined willpower forces Malice to be stuck between them. This allows Sinister to trap her. The Boys get away, as their battle does not draw the attention of the local authorities until after their getaway.

Later, Ruckus appears at a speech given by Senator Kelly in an attempt to assassinate the senator. The X-Men stop Ruckus, and he is placed in custody. Ruckus was apparently able to evade custody as he was seen attending the X-Cise clinic as a client in the hope of receiving the mutant cure, however this was all a scheme by the Red Skull. Joined with Ramrod, Ruckus later travelled to England and attempted to rob banks but both were arrested, and saved by the X-Men from a Terrigen Mist cloud about to hit their prison.

Meanwhile Slab, Ruckus and Gorgeous George established a drug lab, harvesting and selling mutant growth hormone, until Psylocke attacked their lab, defeated the three in combat and shut down their operation. The Nasty Boys were later hunted down and killed by the Upstarts, in order to lure out Cyclops and his ragtag team of X-Men to Washington Heights. After a brief moment of words, the two groups engaged each other in battle with the X-Men gaining the upperhand.

Members
There are five Nasty Boys:

In other media

While the Nasty Boys make few appearances in comics featuring "X" teams, the villainous team was featured prominently in FOX's 1992 X-Men animated TV series. Appearing first in the episode "'Til Death Do Us Part, Part II", the cartoon featured four of the Boys: Gorgeous George (the Boys' field leader), Hairbag, Ruckus, and Slab. Ruckus is voiced by Dan Hennessey and Gorgeous George is voiced by Rod Wilson. 

The X-Man Morph, who had been resurrected by Sinister, had an "evil" side to his personality. "Evil" Morph was often a part-time member of the Nasty Boys, but Sinister increasingly lost control of him. The Nasty Boys reappear in both parts of "Reunion" where, teamed with the Savage Land Mutates. They prove to be quite imposing to the X-Men, whom Sinister had rendered powerless. The X-Men eventually regain their powers, free Morph from Sinister completely, and defeat Sinister and the Boys. 

After leaving the Savage Land, the Boys reappear with Sinister in all four parts of "Beyond Good and Evil". Vertigo apparently accompanies them (Sinister had given her a Magneto-inspired energy boost in "Reunion") and is made into a member, despite her female status. In the comics, Vertigo was originally a member of the Savage Land Mutates, but she joins the Marauders and helps to annihilate most of the Morlocks during the Mutant Massacre.

References

External links
 Nasty Boys profile at uncannyxmen.net

Fictional henchmen
Marvel Comics supervillain teams
Characters created by Peter David
X-Men supporting characters